Mahmoud Al Youssef (born 20 January 1988) is a Syrian professional football goalkeeper who is currently for Hetten.

Club career

Syria
Mahmoud began his professional career in 2007 with Hutteen Latakia.

References

External links

Mahmoud Al-Youssef - GOALZZ.com
Mahmoud Al-Youssef - KOOORA

1988 births
Living people
Syrian footballers
People from Latakia
Hutteen Latakia players
Al-Musannah SC players
United Victory players
Victory Sports Club players
Maziya S&RC players
Al-Jabalain FC players
Al-Jaish Damascus players
Al-Mujazzal Club players
Al-Diriyah Club players
Hetten FC players
Oman Professional League players
Saudi First Division League players
Saudi Second Division players
Syria international footballers
Expatriate footballers in Saudi Arabia
Syrian expatriate sportspeople in Saudi Arabia
Expatriate footballers in Oman
Syrian expatriates in Oman
Expatriate footballers in the Maldives
Association football goalkeepers
2019 AFC Asian Cup players
Syrian Premier League players